The Gneiss and Granite Plateau (also called the Granite and Gneiss Highland (Granit- und Gneishochland), is one of the five major landscapes in Austria. It forms the Mühlviertel and Waldviertel in the states of Upper and Lower Austria. Geologically it is the Austrian part of the Bohemian Massif.

References

External links 

 , RockyAustria, Geologische Bundesanstalt Wien

Bohemian Massif
Regions of Austria